Gray zone lymphoma, often presenting as large tumors in the mediastinum, is a type of lymphoma that is characterized by having cellular features of both classic Hodgkin's lymphomas (cHL) and large B-cell lymphomas.

Sources
 Traverse-Glehen A, Mediastinal gray zone lymphoma: the missing link between classic Hodgkin's lymphoma and mediastinal large B-cell lymphoma. Am J Surg Pathol  2005 Nov; 29(11):1411-21
 Hodgkin’s lymphoma and Grey-zone lymphomas

Lymphoma